Dulce is a soundtrack album composed by American experimental rock band Sun City Girls, released in 1998 by Abduction Records.

Background
According to the album's liner notes written by Alan Bishop, the band received a request in 1995 from a Japanese man, Hachiro Maki, who claimed to be a member of the Japanese doomsday cult Aum Shinrikyo, to produce a soundtrack for his film project about "a secret underground alien base in New Mexico most commonly referred to as Dulce". Next year, during their tour in Japan, the band met the director in Osaka in a temple courtyard. After reviewing rough cuts of the movie, they were given one million yen for their soundtrack services.

Style
As Dean McFarlane of Allmusic writes, the album is stylistically varied "from the spaced-out improvisation and ethnic drone to the cutting electric rock of the Torch of the Mystics era". Behind the "freakish sound" of Dulce, he observes such influences as Zabriskie Point and Ennio Morricone's work from the 1970s.

Track listing

Personnel
Adapted from the Dulce liner notes.

Sun City Girls
 Alan Bishop – bass guitar
 Richard Bishop – guitar, recording (4, 7, 9)
 Charles Gocher – drums, percussion

Additional musicians
 Eyvind Kang – electric guitar (2, 8), violin (2, 8)
 Ryuichi Masuda – bass guitar (2, 8), effects (2, 8)
 Jesse Paul Miller – clarinet (3)
 Tatsuya Yoshida – vocals (2, 8), percussion (2, 8)
Production and additional personnel
 Scott Colburn – recording (1-3, 5, 6, 8, 10-12)

Release history

References

External links 
 

1998 soundtrack albums
Sun City Girls albums